The Israel Resilience Party, is a liberal political party in Israel founded in December 2018 by Benny Gantz, former Chief of the General Staff of the Israel Defense Forces. The party first ran in the April 2019 Knesset elections, as part of the Blue and White alliance.

History
On 16 February 2015, Gantz completed his term as Chief of the General Staff and entered a three-year legal cooling-off period in which he could not run for the Knesset. This ended on 2 July 2018. Subsequently, in September 2018, it was reported that Gantz planned to enter politics.

On 26 December 2018, the 20th Knesset voted to dissolve itself and hold early elections. A day later, on 27 December, after 109 people signed a list of founders, the party was officially registered with the name Hosen L'Yisrael.
 
Telem (the party of former IDF chief of staff and minister of defense Moshe Ya'alon) formed an alliance with the Israel Resilience Party on 29 January 2019.

On 7 February 2019, the party and Telem announced seven candidates who will receive prominent spots on their joint slate: Zvi Hauser, Miki Haimovich, Yoaz Hendel, Hili Tropper, Meirav Cohen, Michael Biton, and Orit Farkash-Hacohen. Michal Cotler-Wunsh, a lawyer and the daughter of former Canadian Justice Minister Irwin Cotler, will also reportedly be on the list.

On 16 February 2019, Gantz's party announced that Histadrut Labor Chairman Avi Nissenkorn will be on the party's list for the upcoming elections.

On 21 February 2019, the party announced that it was merging with Yesh Atid in order to form a centrist alliance for the upcoming elections. The united slate is called Blue and White.

During the April election, Blue and White's large lead evaporated, leaving Blue and White with a tie with Likud, which, however, had enough recommendations to start coalition negotiations. This failed, and rather than giving Gantz an opportunity to form a government, the Knesset was dissolved and an election was called for September.

Ideology and policies

According to the official registration document handed to the Registrar of Parties on 27 December 2018, the Israel Resilience Party's goals are:

Continuing to establish and strengthen the State of Israel as a Jewish and democratic state in light of the Zionist vision, as expressed in the Declaration of Independence, while determining and changing the national priorities on the following subjects: education, national infrastructure development, agriculture, law and internal security, welfare policy, and peace and security.

In his first campaign speech on 29 January 2019, party leader Gantz described Israel as "a leading high-tech country with a low-tech government that is self-employed". He vowed to provide incentives for entrepreneurs and medical students, "impose harsh sanctions on those who speculatively raise land and housing prices", as well as build and expand more hospitals. Furthermore, he said he will create new jobs in the agriculture sector.

Gantz also focused on ensuring equal rights and opportunities for all citizens, and combating violence against women. He promised to "deepen my partnerships with the ultra-Orthodox, the Arabs, and the Druze" in establishing a civil service for all, in addition to army service.

Regarding national security, Gantz vowed to "strengthen the settlement blocs and the Golan Heights, from which we will never retreat", also pledging that a "United Jerusalem" will forever remain Israel's capital. He said that the Jordan Valley should remain as the country's eastern security border, without allowing the Palestinians living beyond the separation barrier to "endanger our security and our identity as a Jewish state". He said he will strive for peace, mentioning the treaties with Egypt and Jordan, and commending prime ministers Menachem Begin, Yitzhak Rabin, and even his current rival Benjamin Netanyahu as "patriots". Gantz personally addressed Iranian general Qassem Suleimani and Hezbollah leader Hassan Nasrallah that he "will not tolerate a threat to Israeli sovereignty", and warned Hamas leader Ahmed Sinwar, "I suggest you not test me again."

According to Gantz, he leans right when it comes to security issues, left when it comes to socio-economic issues, and liberal in his economic goals.

Criticism 
Three victims of alleged sexual abuse criticised the Israel Resilience Party for hiring Ronen Tzur as a strategic advisor. Tzur was the media strategist behind a campaign to block the extradition of Malka Leifer, who faces 74 charges of sex abuse in Melbourne, Australia.

Leaders

Election results

Current MKs

References

Liberal parties in Israel
Zionist political parties in Israel
Political parties in Israel
Political parties established in 2018
2018 establishments in Israel